The Guangdong–Hong Kong–Macao Greater Bay Area (GD-HK-MO) also referred to as the Greater Bay Area (GBA), is a megalopolis, consisting of nine cities and two special administrative regions in South China. It is envisioned as an integrated economic area aimed at taking a leading role globally by 2035.

It is the largest and most populated urban area and it is among the four largest bay areas in the world, comparable with the bay areas of New York City, Tokyo, and San Francisco. The GBA – with a total population of approximately 71.2 million people (5% of China's total population) – includes nine mega cities of Guangdong province: Guangzhou, Shenzhen, Zhuhai, Foshan, Dongguan, Zhongshan, Jiangmen, Huizhou, and Zhaoqing as well as two special administrative regions, Hong Kong, and Macao (Macau). Hong Kong, Guangzhou, and Shenzhen have been described among the world's 50 "superstar cities". Surrounding the Pearl River Delta with a total area of 56,000 km2 (corresponds to the area of Croatia), it is the largest and the richest economic region in South China.

The GBA's combined regional GDP is US$1,641.97 billion in 2018, which is equivalent to 12 percent of GDP for all of China and would rank the GBA as the 12th biggest economy in the world. As one of China's most vibrant and important regions, the GBA has the highest concentration of Fortune 500 companies in the country and houses a majority of China's most innovative technology companies, such as Huawei, ZTE, DJI, and Tencent (parent company of WeChat). GBA has a rich ecosystem of startups, incubators, and accelerators in the fields of agile tech, biotech, medical tech, and innovation. For these reasons, many experts consider the region an emerging Silicon Valley of Asia. Given traditional divisions between the provincial and municipal governments and business elites, there are some opinions that the ambitious idea behind the GBA might be difficult to implement.

Definition and historical development 
The "Guangdong–Hong Kong–Macao Greater Bay Area" is sometimes confused with the area of the Pearl River Delta and Guangdong province. While the geographical term “Pearl River Delta” was coined in 1947 reflecting the region's rich and diverse local histories, the term “Guangdong–Hong Kong–Macao Greater Bay Area” refers to a much larger area. Within the discourse on regional planning and mega-city positioning, the Pearl River Delta's spatial structure has been contoured and realigned according to changing administrative boundaries, economic productivity, and infrastructural connectivity. In the early 2000s, Chinese scholars began using the term “Greater Pearl River Delta” (GPRD) which described the 9 + 2 city agglomeration that encompassed post-handover Hong Kong and Macao. The GPRD was conceptualized as a series of lesser cities as industrial nodes with specialist functions clustering around two prominent cores – Guangzhou, the provincial capital, and Shenzhen. In 2003, Guangdong province advocated the idea of “Pan-PRD” as an even more extensive regional construct that comprised nine neighboring provinces to promote economic cooperation. A somewhat similar idea should later be mentioned in the English version of China's 13th Five-Year Plan, taking the Pearl River Delta and including the larger province of Guangdong. Four years later finally, on 13 April 2017, the heading of a piece of news released at the English language government website of the State Council adopted the name "Guangdong–Hong Kong–Macao Bay Area". Just over two months later, on 1 July 2017, the "Framework Agreement on Deepening Guangdong–Hong Kong–Macao Cooperation in the Development of the Bay Area" was signed in Hong Kong. From then on, the term “Guangdong–Hong Kong–Macao Greater Bay Area” has been widely used to refer to the region in officially translated sources. English-language sources tend to simply refer to the area as “Greater Bay Area” or GBA for short. Its geographical makeup, the cities it encompasses and its population centers are detailed in the section below.

Geography and population centers 
The GBA is located in the southern coastal area of China (21◦320–24◦260N, 111◦200–115◦240E). Located in the very south part of China, the climate of the Greater Bay Area ranges from humid subtropical to tropical climate in the far south. There are a few mountain ranges collectively called the Nan Mountains (Nan Ling) as well as a few inactive volcanoes on Leizhou Peninsula.

The Greater Bay Area consists of nine cities of Guangdong Province, which account for around 30 % of the land mass of Guangdong Province, plus the Special Administrative Regions of Hong Kong and Macao. It is in the Pearl River Delta along the South China coast. 

Mountain ranges and peninsulas shape the GBA. The province of Guangdong, for instance, possesses a coastline of  due to the multiplicity of islands, bays and peninsulas. This multiplicity of small islands results from the Pearl River Delta, which is the convergent point of the East, North and West Rivers. It is therefore unsurprising that the network of bays and rivers has contributed to the archipelagic nature of many cities within the GBA. The cities of Guangzhou, Zhuhai, Hong Kong, and Macao for instance "each possess constituent and distinctly islanded territorial niches that are focused on particular industrial areas."

The entire area has temperate springs (March to May), hot and wet summers (June to August), clear and cool autumns (September to November), and mild, rainy winters (December to February). The annual average temperature of Guangdong Province is around 22.3℃, with the average temperature of 16–19℃ in January and 28–29℃ in July. However, the highest temperature in summer goes more than 35℃ and the lowest can be lower than 10℃. Temperatures in Hong Kong and Macao are nearly the same, with the annual average temperature around 23℃, a little higher due to their location more to the south and closer to the equator. GBA receives abundant amount of precipitation throughout the year.

GBA has a total population of approximately 86.17 million people (5% of China's total population). The population is expected to reach 100 million people by 2030.

Economy 
The Greater Bay Area is a critical export hub, accounting for 37% of China's exports. This is due to the large airports and railway stations connected by a modern transportation system. GBA hosts three of the world's top ten container ports and five international airports (Hong Kong International Airport, Guangzhou Baiyun International Airport, Shenzhen Bao'an International Airport, Macau International Airport and Zhuhai Jinwan Airport). These airports account for an air freight traffic bigger than San Francisco, New York, and Tokyo combined.

The GBA is an economic powerhouse. Its combined regional GDP reached US$1,641.97 billion in 2018, equivalent to 12 per cent of mainland China's GDP. If the GBA were its own country, it would rank as the 12th biggest economy globally (almost equal to South Korea's and bigger than Australia's economy). GDP growth of GBA was 4.4 per cent in 2019, and GDP is expected to reach US$4 trillion by 2030, which would lead the GBA's GDP to overtake that of Germany in 2019.

The region has a diverse economic outlook with industrial development zones in all eleven cities covering emerging industries, R&D and high-end sectors. Among the emerging industries, the Internet of Things (IoT), Artificial Intelligence, hydrogen technologies, new mobility, and cleantech are most prominent. Another rapidly growing economic area in the GBA is healthcare. The Guangzhou International Bio-Technology Island (formerly known as Dove Island) located in Huangpu district, Guangzhou is a biotech industrial zone in the region.

Besides prioritizing innovation and high-tech industries, the GBA seeks to draw in foreign investors. For that purpose, The Opinions Concerning Financial Support for the Establishment of the Guangdong-Hong Kong-Macao Greater Bay Area envisaged gradual financial liberalization. Additionally, In May 2020, the People's Bank of China has introduced new measures aimed at liberalizing China's controls on foreign exchange and foreign currency remittance.

Outline Development Plan 
The core idea behind the development of the Greater Bay Area (GBA) is laid out in ‘Outline Development Plan for the Guangdong-Hong Kong-Macao Greater Bay Area’ released by the Chinese central government in February 2019. The ambitious goal foresees a linkage of the nine cities in Guangdong province's Pearl River Delta, Hong Kong and Macau into an economically integrated world-class business hub. The document stipulates crucial milestones for the GBA. If achieved, they are expected to transform the GBA into an international first-class bay area in 2022 and evolve the region into an international first-class bay area by 2035. The progress will be achieved through deepening reform, prioritising innovation, accelerating connectivity, and improving the environmental footprint in the region.

The Outline Development Plan foresees the implementation of several infrastructural projects. For instance, developing a world-class airport cluster in the region and building inter-city high-speed rail links and motorways to improve connectivity both within the GBA and beyond.  The planned construction of two bridges across the Pearl River Delta will significantly reduce travelling times within the region and simultaneously promote a free flow of people, goods, capital, and information in the region. Given rising concerns about the environmental impact of rapid urbanisation and infrastructure development, the Outline Development Plan includes ecological conservation as well as green and low-carbon development models. The end goal stipulated by the document is to transform the GBA into a services-oriented economy.

To realise this end goal, the four designated “core cities'' will be developed according to their respective comparative advantages. First, Hong Kong. It is planned to strengthen its position as an international hub for financial and logistical services. Second, Macau. The former Portuguese colony is envisioned to develop into a centre for international tourism, leisure and cultural exchange, as well as a trading hub with Portuguese-speaking countries. Third, Guangzhou. The city is planned as a commerce, transportation and education hub. Fourth, Shenzhen, which will focus on innovation. With each city specialising further in their respective comparative advantages, the GBA is supposed to become a “vibrant world-class city cluster”.

The Development Plan for the Guangdong–Hong Kong–Macao Greater Bay Area gave a vital impulse to the rapid advancement of urbanisation. It foresees establishing data ports, information networks, electronic payment, and telecommunication systems, and developing “smart transport, smart energy, smart municipal management and smart communities”.

Smart urbanization and role of Special Economic and Technological Development Districts 
The Reform and Opening Up process triggered China's rapid economic rise over the past three decades. One of the pillars of this economic reform was the 'Open Door policy' of 1978, paired with the creation of Special Economic Zones (SEZs). By allowing and encouraging foreign direct investments, these zones became engines of China's further economic, social, urban, and political development.  The first SEZs were established in 1979, starting with Shenzhen next to Hong Kong and Zhuhai adjacent to Macao, pioneering experiments devised to exploit the capability of differences of each city. As accelerators of economic growth, these zones were characterized by skilled labour and an abundance of resources.

There are currently over 2000 so-called "economic development zones" (or EDZs) in China. While the term "economic development zone" is the official and literal translation of the Chinese term "经济开发区 (pinyin: jīngjì kāifāqū)", it may be better translated as "economic clusters" in English. Among these clusters, Guangzhou Economic and Technological Development Zone, Foshan National High-Tech Industrial Development Zone and Zhaoqing High-Tech Industrial Development Zone are located within the GBA.

With the rising economic importance, the GBA also underwent unprecedented urban growth over the past three decades. The total urban areas have expanded from 652.74 km2 in 1986 to 8137.09 km2 in 2017 (approximately 13 times), at an 8.28% average annual growth rate. Main driving factors of the urban expansions in the GBA were rapidly increasing GDP, income, and population.Guangzhou, Shenzhen, Foshan, and Dongguan recorded the most remarkable urbanization changes, while Hong Kong and Macau had respectively lower magnitudes of change (118.53 and 6.98 km2, respectively).

Due to its industrial strength, advanced infrastructure, and vast human resources, GBA is an ideal place for developing and implementing smart city solutions. Thanks to the highly connected and innovation-driven entrepreneurial landscape of I&T trailblazers like Guangzhou, Shenzhen and Hong Kong, the Greater Bay Area consistently develops artificial intelligence, robotics, biomedical and healthcare technology, energy distribution systems and data connectivity sectors. These sectors are playing a key role in smart and sustainable urban development solutions.

The main challenges faced by the GBA while advancing urban solutions is growing environmental and air pollution, improvements in cross-border mobility of people and goods, as well as capital flow, information, and data. In terms of environmental problems, a study by Wang et al. projected that urbanization and climate change will lead to an 8.87% increase in the exposure duration of dangerous discomfort (Humidex equal to/above 45) for GBA residents by 2030.

Industrial traditions in GBA 
GBA is a core platform for prototyping and fast engineering, with both cost and timelines for prototyping being the lowest in the world. GBA's industrial traditions have been long anchored in Guangzhou and modernized in Shenzhen.

These industrial traditions in the GBA are the foundation upon which its future development is built. Its current GDP is primarily generated in traditional industries and based on tried and tested business models. The spectrum ranges from wood and plastics processing to new textiles and materials to manufacturing state-of-the-art electronic components. It also includes companies in the food and construction sectors, the automotive and aircraft industries, manufacturers of high-end medical products, as well as IT companies and software and hardware producers. Building upon the years-long manufacturing traditions in the region, the Outline Development Plan sets the goals of creating clusters for advanced equipment manufacturing in Zhuhai and Foshan, and high-end manufacturing industries in Shenzhen and Dongguan.

The industrial tradition of the GBA is what is considered to make it a crucial future location by experts. Since the GBA is building on a modern industrial infrastructure grown over decades, its future importance for developments in high-tech and digitalization are seen to be increasing. According to one expert, metro lines, high-speed lines, 5G internet, and intelligent and autonomous systems will be present in the GBA by 2022.

Education and research 
GBA is home to numerous universities with hospitals and academic centres. Among them are the “University Town” located on the Xiaoguwei Island in Guangzhou is considered as one of the “ten cores” of the “Science and Technology Innovation Corridor (STIC)”-blueprint for “China's Silicon Valley”. The most prominent among 12 universities of the “University Town” is Sun Yat-sen University which ranks 38th in Asia and among 251–300th globally by Time Higher Education magazine.

Numerous highly rated medical schools operate in the region, including the First Affiliated Hospital of Sun Yat-sen University, a leading hospital with over 3,000 beds. Several world leaders in translational medicine are based in GBA, such as the lung cancer authority Professor Yi-Long Wu (vice-president of the Guangdong General Hospital and Guangdong Academy of Medical Sciences, and a director of Guangdong Lung Cancer Institute).

Overall, GBA has over 200 universities, producing many college and advanced degrees graduates — over 570,000 college students a year graduates only in Guangzhou. Within the GBA, Hong Kong hosts the highest density of top universities globally. Times Higher Education lists as the Top 5 of them the University of Hong Kong (ranked place 39 worldwide in 2021), the Chinese University of Hong Kong (ranked 56 worldwide in 2021), the Hong Kong University of Science and Technology (ranked 56 worldwide in 2021), the City University of Hong Kong (ranked 126 worldwide in 2021) and the Hong Kong Polytechnic University (ranked 129 worldwide in 2021).

Infrastructure and transportation 
GBA is rapidly evolving into the dynamic world-class city cluster connected with the modern transportation network featuring Huangpu Bridge, Guangzhou-Shenzhen-Hong Kong High-speed Railway, Hong Kong-Zhuhai-Macao Bridge (HZM Bridge), Nansha Bridge and Guangzhou-Shenzhen Intercity Railway.

There are also massive ongoing infrastructure projects underway. Among them – construction of Guangzhou-Zhanjiang High-speed Railway, Gangzhou-Shenzhen Highspeed Railway and Guangzhou-Shanwei-Shantou High-speed Railway.

Further step in GBA's infrastructure development is establishment of airport clusters. Five main airports – Hong Kong International Airport, Guangzhou Baiyun International Airport, Shenzhen Bao'an International Airport, Macau International Airport and Zhuhai Jinwan Airport—as well as a group of feeder airports, will constitute a cluster that will be developed in two phases.

Phase one, due for completion in 2025, will establish a Greater Bay Area airport conglomerate, with greater interaction between the facilities. Phase 2 aims to lift all the airports to a world-class level by 2035 with "safe, green, smart, human and synergetic qualities".

Bridges 
 Huangpu Bridge
 Nansha Bridge
 Humen Pearl River Bridge
 Shenzhen-Zhongshan Bridge
 Hong Kong-Zhuhai-Macau Bridge

Rail 
Urban rail transit (including metros, commuter and regional railways) is expanding very fast. Hong Kong MTR was the first, and its model has subsequently been applied to other networks in the region. The total length of all cities' metro lines is now .

Metro 
 Dongguan Rail Transit
 Foshan Metro
 Guangzhou Metro
 Hong Kong Mass Transit Railway
 Macau Light Rapid Transit
 Shenzhen Metro

Regional and commuter railway 
 CR C-train (several sections)

Light rail and tram 
 Guangzhou Trams
 Hong Kong Light Rail
 Hong Kong Tramways
 Hong Kong Peak Tram
 Shenzhen Tram
 Zhuhai Tram

Intercity railway 
 Guangzhou–Kowloon through train
 Guangzhou–Shenzhen–Hong Kong Express Rail Link Hong Kong section
 Guangzhou–Foshan–Zhaoqing intercity railway
 Guangzhou–Shenzhen railway
 Dongguan–Huizhou intercity railway
 Guangzhou-Zhuhai-Jiangmen intercity railway

Air 
 Hong Kong International Airport
 Macau International Airport
 Shenzhen Bao'an International Airport
 Guangzhou Baiyun International Airport
 Zhuhai Jinwan Airport
 Foshan Shadi Airport
 Huizhou Pingtan Airport

Culture 
Being part of the Silk Road as well as Chinese international marine gates and trade hotspot for the last two thousand years, GBA features rich palette of cultural and folk traditions, languages, and food. Among them, a distinct European ambience – the Cantonese culture with its center in Guangzhou (also known as Canton and formerly romanized as Kwangchow), Macau, eastern Guangxi, and Hong Kong.

Hong Kong and Macau also has its distinct local culture, largely based on Cantonese culture, but also heavily influenced by British and Portuguese colonisation over the past two centuries.

The distinct feature of Cantonese culture is the Cantonese language and Cantonese cuisine. Cantonese language is the official spoken language in the semi-autonomous regions of Hong Kong and Macau. In Guangdong and Guangxi, Mandarin Chinese is the official language taught in schools, but Cantonese is most frequently used in everyday life.

History 
Its relationship with the sea has shaped the Greater Bay Area for centuries. The first known ships from the area are believed to have been constructed by the people of the Nanyue Kingdom (204–112 BCE), who employed them for cultural and economic exchanges with countries as far as present-day Vietnam. After the takeover of the Han Dynasty, trading relations expanded beyond to reach Sri Lanka. During the subsequent period of the Three Kingdoms, these trade routes were consolidated. Trade and cultural exchanges grew. Among this, the port of Guangzhou played a major role for the region's trade and cultural exchanges for over two thousand years. Established under the Kingdom of Wu during the period of the Three Kingdoms (222–280 CE), it eventually grew to become the starting point of the ancient maritime silk road during the Eastern Jin Dynasty (317–420 CE). By the fourth century CE, communities of foreign merchants began establishing themselves in the city.

Since the first foreign merchants have established themselves in Guangdong, the whole GBA region's importance for global trade has only increased. When Macao became a Portuguese colony in the mid-1550s, it represented one of the first trading ports in the Far East. It was later joined by Guangzhou, whose port was the only one remaining open for foreign trade during the closure of the country under the Qing. The Opium Wars brought Hong Kong under British control and forced the opening of other ports in the region. While their respective economic importance was subject to fluctuations later on, the establishment of special economic zones should begin to drive their economic importance anew.

Another economic engine in the GBA is the provincial capital of Guangdong province – Guangzhou. Thanks to a rich industrial and high tech economic environment the city was able to attract first US investments such as Coca-Cola, Procter & Gamble, Pepsi in 1990s and to date is the most concentrated area of U.S.-financed enterprises which have invested in southern China.

Another milestone in the development of GBA was reached on 18 February 2019 by adoption of the Outline Development Plan for the Guangdong–Hong Kong–Macao Greater Bay Area. The ambitious goal foresees a linkage of the nine cities in Guangdong province's Pearl River Delta, Hong Kong and Macau into an integrated economy and world-class business hub. The document-stipulated crucial milestones for GBA is a formation of the Framework for an international first-class bay area in 2022 and an evolution of the region into an international first-class bay area by 2035. The progress will be achieved through deepening reform, prioritizing innovation, accelerating connectivity, and improving the environmental footprint in the region.

In addition, GBA is expected to play a key role in Belt and Road Initiative by connecting Southern China with the countries along the 21st Century Maritime Silk Road.

See also 

 Pearl River Delta
 Pearl River Delta Economic Zone
 Pearl River
 Bocca Tigris
 Metropolitan regions of China
 Yangtze River Delta
 Yellow River Delta and Bohai Sea
 National Central City
Special Economic Zones of China
South China

References 

Transborder agglomerations
 
Landforms of Guangdong
Landforms of Hong Kong
Landforms of Macau
South China